The Cortlandt Street station was a station at Church Street on the demolished IRT Sixth Avenue Line in Manhattan, New York City. It had 3 tracks and two side platforms. It was served by trains from the IRT Sixth Avenue Line and opened on June 5, 1878. It closed on December 4, 1938. The next southbound stop was Rector Street. The next northbound stop was Park Place.

References

IRT Sixth Avenue Line stations
Railway stations in the United States opened in 1878
Railway stations closed in 1938
Former elevated and subway stations in Manhattan
1878 establishments in New York (state)
1938 disestablishments in New York (state)